Thetford is a market town in the English county of Norfolk.

Thetford may also refer to:

Places

Canada
 Thetford Mines, Quebec, Canada

England
 Thetford, Lincolnshire, England
 Thetford, Cambridgeshire, civil parish in Cambridgeshire, England
 Little Thetford, a village in the parish
 Thetford (UK Parliament constituency), Norfolk

United States
 Thetford, Vermont, United States
 Thetford Township, Michigan, United States

See also 
 Thedford (disambiguation)